Kirrama is a rural locality in the Tablelands Region, Queensland, Australia.

Geography
The locality is bounded to the south and west by the Herbert River. The Blencoe Falls are within the south of the locality and the Herbert River Falls are on the boundary of Kirrama and Wairuna.

The Blencoe Falls are on the Wet Tropics Great Walk.

History 
The locality takes its name from the Kirrama pastoral run in 1870s. The name is thought to be the Indigenous language group name Keremai or Kirimai local to the area.

References 

Tablelands Region
Localities in Queensland